The Americus movement was a civil rights protest that began in Americus (located in Sumter County), Georgia, United States, in 1963 and lasted until 1965. It was organized by the Student Nonviolent Coordinating Committee along with the NAACP. Its main goals were voter registration and a citizenship education plan.

First protests
The first march began in 1963, in an effort to desegregate the Martin Theater. Less than a dozen activists participated in the first march. Soon, some 250 people were involved. Law enforcement, led by police chief Ross Chambliss, and County Sheriff Fred Chappell began arresting many. Martin Luther King Jr. once called Chappell "the meanest man in the world."

Leesburg Stockade

In July 1963, another march was held, in which a group of young women joined the line to attempt to purchase tickets at the movie theater, and were arrested for doing so. After being held briefly in Dawson, Georgia, the protesters were moved to the Leesburg Stockade Public Works Building in Leesburg, where they were held for 45 days in poor conditions. Estimates of the number of young women who were held there range from 15 to about 30
or as many as 33. Some of the prisoners were as young as 12.

Conditions in the stockade were poor: the prisoners had only concrete floors to sleep on, water only in drips from a shower, a single non-functional toilet, and poor food. The prison authorities did not inform the parents of the prisoners of their arrest or location, and they only found out through the help of a janitor.

The young women were threatened with murder, and at one point a rattlesnake was thrown into their cell.

After the SNCC and Senator Harrison A. Williams used a set of photos by Danny Lyon to publicize the situation, the young women were released. They did not face any criminal charges, but were nevertheless charged a fee for their use of the facilities. They later became known as the "Stolen Girls".

Two of the Leesburg Stockade women, Carol Barner Seay and Sandra Russel Mansfield, were added to the Hall of Fame of the National Voting Rights Museum in 2007. The National Museum of African American History and Culture of the Smithsonian Institution publicized the story of the stolen girls in 2016, and they were recognized by a resolution of the Georgia state legislature.

Girls of the stockade

 Carol Barner Seay 
 Lorena Barnum 
 Gloria Breedlove
 Pearl Brown 
 Bobbie Jean Butts 
 Agnes Carter 
 Pattie Jean Colier 
 Mattie Crittenden 
 Barbara Jean Daniels 
 Gloria Dean 
 Carolyn Deloatch 
 Diane Dorsey 
 Juanita Freeman 
 Robertiena Freeman 
 Henrietta Fuller 
 Shirley Ann Green
 Verna Hollis
 Evette Hose 
 Mary Frances Jackson 
 Vyrtis Jackson
 Dorothy Jones 
 Emma Jean Jones 
 Melinda Jones-Williams 
 Emmarene Kaigler 
 Barbara Ann Peterson
 Annie Lue Ragans
 Judith Reid 
 Laura Ruff 
 Sandra Russell
 Willie Mae Smith 
 Eliza Thomas 
 Billie Jo Thornton 
 Lulu M. Westbrook 
 Ozeliar Whitehead 
 Carrie Mae Williams

Results
The Americus movement resulted in a higher level of political participation by African Americans in Sumter County and the desegregation of many public places. It also contributed to the passing of the Voting Rights Act of 1965.

In 2007 veterans of the movement returned to Americus as part of a newly established organization, the Americus–Sumter County Movement Remembered, which is dedicated to commemorating and preserving the history and legacy of the Americus movement.

In popular culture
Episode 6 of the 15th season of Mysteries at the Museum covered the Leesburg Stockade.

References

Further reading

External links
 - Author Jim Auchmutey discusses his book, The Class of '65: A Student, a Divided Town, and the Long Road to Forgiveness.

Civil rights protests in the United States